"Shake You Down" is a song by American R&B artist, writer and producer Gregory Abbott. It was released in August 1986 as the lead single from his debut album. It became Abbott's biggest hit and was certified platinum by the RIAA. The track is also featured in the 2007 film Are We Done Yet?

Composition
According to Billboard, the song is about sex.

Music video
Dominic Sena of Propaganda Films came up with the idea of the scrolling effect on the music video. It is recorded as a single image on a photographic film.

There is also another music video recorded in Rio de Janeiro, especially for the Brazilian TV show Fantástico.

Chart performance
"Shake You Down" was released as the first single from the album also titled Shake You Down. It went to number one on the black singles chart in October 1986, and on January 17, 1987, it reached the top spot on the Billboard Hot 100 singles chart. Billboard ranked it as the No. 3 song for 1987. It was a hit across the Atlantic Ocean, as well, peaking at number six in the UK Singles Chart (spending a total of 13 weeks on that chart from 22 November 1986). It was not intended as the original single to promote the album, as "I Got the Feeling" was scheduled to be the first single. It was postponed as the follow-up, peaking at #56.

Weekly charts

Year-end charts

All-time charts

References

External links
 [ Gregory Abbott at Allmusic]

1986 debut singles
1986 songs
1980s ballads
Gregory Abbott songs
Billboard Hot 100 number-one singles
Cashbox number-one singles
Contemporary R&B ballads
Columbia Records singles
Music videos directed by Dominic Sena